KZMP (1540 kHz) is a commercial AM radio station licensed to University Park, Texas, and serving the Dallas-Fort Worth Metroplex. It is owned by Estrella Media and airs a Classic Regional Mexican radio format.  KZMP is currently operating under special temporary authority from the Federal Communications Commission at 100 watts, due to the sale of the land on which the 4 tower array broadcast. Current programming is temporally simulcast from co-owned 106.7 KZZA, while the facility, equipment, and license are being sold from Estrella Media to Richard Witkowski's North Texas Radio Group L.P. for $250,000.

History
This station signed on as KCUL in 1949, originally licensed to Fort Worth, Texas.  KCUL was owned by East-West Broadcasting and featured a variety format through the 1950s. The station's call sign was chosen for investor A. B. Culbertson, although other sources mention a connection with Fort Worth-area optometrist L. H. Luck, because "K-C-U-L" was "Luck" spelled backwards.

In the mid 1950s, KCUL switched to a country music format. Blocks of Spanish language programming were added in 1958 and the station became largely a Regional Mexican music outlet in the 1960s. By 1964, the radio station had picked up a sister station on the FM dial and hired Marcos Rodriguez, Sr. father of Marcos A. Rodriguez to be morning DJ and afternoon salesperson.  At the time, FM radio in America was in its infancy.  Listeners did not listen to FM very much and broadcasters weren't sure the technology was going to last.

On New Year's Day, 1967, KCUL-AM-FM were sold by East-West Broadcasting to John Walton and was rebranded "Classical Country" KBUY, maintaining its Country format with Western music added. It became the first full-time Country/Western station in the Dallas/Fort Worth area; the format adjustment was described as "an 'uptown' version of its predecessor, KCUL."

In 1976, the station again rebranded as KRXV (call sign derived from Roman numerals XV as "Radio 15"), this time with an All-News format that lasted for only 14 months. KRXV employed Marcos A. Rodriguez as a board operator and Jim Miklaszewski now an NBC News correspondent as News Director.  Hal Eisner, currently a longtime TV newsman in Los Angeles, also worked at KRXV. The format then changed to beautiful music as "Radio 15," a joint operation between actor Jimmy Stewart and Oklahoma News Network owner William Schuller. In 1978, the call sign was changed to KMZK.  The call letters were an acronym of sorts for "muzik, but the easy-listening format and branding remained the same.

Between 1979 and 1983, the station was revamped as KTIA with a Spanish format. KTIA was founded by a partnership led by Johnny Gonzalez, one of three former 107.1 KESS advertisers, but their purchase coincided with the prime rate going to 20%.  The business went bust and the station went dark for almost a year. The call sign KMIA was established on June 25, 1985, but the station didn't sign on until three months later. The format from that period until 1986 was Spanish, Tropical, and Caribbean music.  Then the format changed to urban contemporary gospel with some Spanish religious programming.  The call sign was said to have stood for Ministry In Action) as "Faith 1540".

From 1988 to 1993, formats were bounced from Religious to Spanish as KSVZ (1988), KSGB (1989), and KTNO (1993). Then in 1997, it was rebranded as KPAD with a Motivational format, airing syndicated programming from the Personal Achievement Radio service (the callsign standing for Personal Achievement in Dallas). But the motivation format didn't last long, and the callsign was changed to KZMP as a simulcast of KTCY until 2003.  Along the way, KTCY and KZMP-FM swapped calls. In 2006, KZMP, along with 3 other stations were sold by Entravision Communications to Liberman.

On June 1, 2009, KZMP-AM struck a local marketing agreement (LMA) with The Walt Disney Company and dropped its FM simulcast ("Radio Salaam Namaste")replacing it with ESPN Deportes Radio.

Starting with the 2011 Major League Baseball season, KESN and KZMP acquired the rights to broadcast all Texas Rangers baseball games for the next four years. English broadcasts aired on KESN while the Spanish-language broadcasts were heard on KZMP. Additionally, the station also carried Spanish audio broadcasts for FC Dallas games.

It was announced on August 7, 2013, that Disney, the owner of ESPN Deportes Radio, had transferred the station's operations to Deportes Media. No changes in the station's programming lineup occurred.

On September 4, 2016, ESPN Deportes Radio was dropped for a simulcast of sister station KZZA 106.7.  KZZA's Classic Regional Mexican format was rebranded as "La Ranchera" the same day. The staff of ESPN Deportes Dallas announced on their Facebook pages that they were in search of a new station.

In July 2018, ESPN Deportes Radio returned to KZMP after an almost two-year absence.  It competed with Univision Radio-owned 1270 KFLC, which broadcasts as a Univision Deportes Radio (now TUDN Radio) network affiliate.

On June 11, 2019, it was announced that ESPN Deportes Radio would cease operations on September 8, and relocate some of its programming to podcast delivery.  The day of the network's shut down, KZMP returned to a simulcast of sister station KZZA's Classic Regional Mexican music.  It rebranded as "La Ranchera 106.7 FM y 1540 AM."

References

External links

 DFW Radio/TV History
 DFW Radio Archives

ZMP
Radio stations established in 1949
ZMP
1949 establishments in Texas
Estrella Media stations
Regional Mexican radio stations in the United States